Inn i evighetens mørke (English: Into Eternal Darkness) is the first EP by Norwegian black metal band Dimmu Borgir. It was first released as a demo in August 1994, and later as an EP on 17 December. The EP was released by Necromantic Gallery Productions on 7-inch vinyl limited to 1000 copies.

The EP is included in the True Kings of Norway split-CD by Spinefarm Records, released in 2000; this version removes all vocals from Part I. In 2003, a bootleg version on Hat Records was released, that only contained the two-part track "Inn i evighetens mørke" and "Raabjørn speiler draugheimens skodde" was not included on this release.

The track "Raabjørn speiler draugheimens skodde" would later be included on the band's debut album For all tid, and would also be re-recorded for Enthrone Darkness Triumphant and the Godless Savage Garden EP as well. Both parts of "Inn i evighetens mørke" were remastered for the re-release of For all tid in 1997, again using the instrumental version of Part I.

Track listing

Personnel

Dimmu Borgir
 Erkekjetter Silenoz – lead vocals, rhythm guitar
 Tjodalv – lead guitar
 Brynjard Tristan – bass guitar
 Stian Aarstad - synthesizers, keyboards, effects
 Shagrath – drums

Additional personnel
 Christophe Szpajdel – logo

References

1994 EPs
Dimmu Borgir albums
Norwegian-language albums